Ganga Pushkaram is a festival of River Ganga which normally occurs once in 12 years. This Pushkaram is observed for a period of 12 days from the time of entry of Jupiter into Aswini nakshatra Mesha rasi (Aries).

See also 
Kumbh Mela
Godavari Pushkaram
Pushkaram

References

Cultural festivals in India
Water and Hinduism
Hindu festivals
Religious tourism in India
Hindu pilgrimages
Ganges
Religious festivals in India